Center Harbor is a town in Belknap County, New Hampshire, United States. As of the 2020 census, the town had a population of 1,040. It is situated between Lake Winnipesaukee and Squam Lake.

History 

Center Harbor separated from the town of New Hampton and was first incorporated in 1797. The town name is derived from two sources: its location, centered between Meredith and Moultonborough harbors, as well as from the Senter family, who were owners of a large amount of property in the area. The town was a landing place for lake steamers and stagecoaches, making it a popular summer resort. Center Harbor was a favorite spot of John Greenleaf Whittier, and the home of Dudley Leavitt, author of the first Farmers' Almanac in 1797. Center Harbor is the winter home of the paddle steamer MS Mount Washington, the largest boat on Lake Winnipesaukee.

Center Harbor witnessed the first intercollegiate sporting event in the United States, as Harvard defeated Yale by two lengths in the first Harvard–Yale Regatta on August 3, 1852 on Lake Winnipesaukee.

Geography 

It has several miles of shoreline on Squam Lake and another mile on Lake Winnipesaukee, where its main "harbor" lies. The town center sits eccentrically near Center Harbor's northeast border, where it rises gently from the shore at the junction of New Hampshire Routes 25 and 25B. The commercial district including the town center extends for several hundred yards along NH 25 into the neighboring town of Moultonborough. Center Harbor lies fully within the Merrimack River watershed.

NH 25 passes through the eastern edge of town, including the town center, connecting Meredith to the south with Moultonborough to the northeast. U.S. Route 3 and NH 25 pass north-south through the western part of town, connecting Meredith to the south with Holderness to the northwest. NH 25B leads from the town center west to US 3 and NH 25, forming a short-cut for through-travelers on NH 25.

The Proctor Wildlife Sanctuary, owned by the Audubon Society of New Hampshire, occupies  of woodlands northwest of the town center. Adjacent to this property is Center Harbor Woods, a  conservation area owned by the Lakes Region Conservation Trust and protected by a conservation easement held by the Squam Lakes Conservation Society and the town of Center Harbor.

Adjacent municipalities 

 Moultonborough (east)
 Meredith (south)
 New Hampton (southwest)
 Holderness (northwest)

Demographics 

As of the census of 2000, there were 996 people, 414 households, and 293 families residing in the town. The population density was 74.4 people per square mile (28.7/km2). There were 653 housing units at an average density of 48.8 per square mile (18.8/km2). The racial makeup of the town was 98.80% White, 1.00% Hispanic or Latino and 0.80% Asian.

There were 414 households, out of which 28.5% had children under the age of 18 living with them, 57.7% were married couples living together, 9.4% had a female householder with no husband present, and 29.2% were non-families. 22.0% of all households were made up of individuals, and 9.4% had someone living alone who was 65 years of age or older. The average household size was 2.38 and the average family size was 2.75.
In the town, the population was spread out, with 21.5% under the age of 18, 5.2% from 18 to 24, 24.0% from 25 to 44, 31.9% from 45 to 64, and 17.4% who were 65 years of age or older. The median age was 45 years. For every 100 females, there were 100.4 males. For every 100 females age 18 and over, there were 101.0 males.

The median income for a household in the town was $51,806, and the median income for a family was $55,938. Males had a median income of $35,526 versus $24,231 for females. The per capita income for the town was $25,627. 6.7% of the population and 4.4% of families were below the poverty line. Out of the total population, 13.4% of those under the age of 18 and 5.6% of those 65 and older were living below the poverty line.

Government 

In the New Hampshire Senate, Center Harbor is in the 2nd District, represented by Republican Bob Giuda. On the Executive Council of New Hampshire, Center Harbor is in the 1st District, represented by Republican Joseph Kenney. In the United States House of Representatives, Center Harbor is in New Hampshire's 2nd congressional district, represented by Democrat Ann McLane Kuster.

Economy 

Aside from small dairy and truck farms, the community's main industry is tourism. Restaurants and motels dot the shoreline, with a beach and playground at the town's center which is shared by residents of Moultonborough. The economy is booming, with the historic E.M Heath Grocery Store tripled in size, and now joined in town by Bayswater Book Co., Gusto's Italian Cafe, Wild Meadow Canoe and Kayak Outfitter, Yikes Art Gallery, and The Edge Handcrafted Boutique. Upscale restaurants have opened, including Canoe and Osteria Poggio, established in a landmark building.

Education 

Center Harbor's one-room schoolhouse closed in the 1970s, and students now attend Inter-Lakes Elementary and Inter-Lakes Junior-Senior High in Meredith, joining students from that town and from Sandwich. During the period 1963–1973, a college existed in Center Harbor. Named Belknap College, it occupied several locations in town, using old hotels for dorms, though the academic campus was located several miles away. Anchored by a mansion recently used for the New Hampshire Music Festival, and several other buildings, the campus was a center of activity.

The town was the home of Immaculate Conception Apostolic School, an all-male Roman Catholic boarding school, educating between 80–100 students from grades 7 to 12. It is sponsored by the Legionaries of Christ, a religious congregation of the Roman Catholic Church.  It was listed for sale in 2021.

Notable people 

 Phoebe Foster (1896–1975), actress
 Harriet Lane Huntress (1860–1922), Deputy Superintendent Public Instruction in New Hampshire
 Dudley Leavitt (1772–1851), publisher
 Brad Leighton (born 1962), driver with NASCAR 
 Maud Worcester Makemson (1891–1977), astronomer
 Penny Pitou (born 1938), Olympic downhill skier

Culture 

Center Harbor hosts a Fourth of July celebration featuring a road race (including a children's race around the library), parade, band concert, and fireworks over the lake. The Center Harbor Town Band, founded in 1878, offers free concerts on Fridays in the summer.  In the winter, the town is a stop for snowmobile enthusiasts.

References

External links 

 
 James E. Nichols Memorial Library
 Center Harbor - NHLiving Magazine
 New Hampshire Economic and Labor Market Information Bureau Profile
 Center Harbor Community Planning Survey, 2018 - includes town history

 
Towns in Belknap County, New Hampshire
Towns in New Hampshire
Populated places on Lake Winnipesaukee